Louis Frederick Kihneman III (born February 17, 1952) is an American prelate of the Catholic Church. He has been serving as bishop of the Diocese of Biloxi in Mississippi since 2017.

Biography
Louis Kihneman was born on February 14, 1952, in Lafayette, Louisiana. On November 18, 1977, he  was ordained by Bishop Thomas  Drury to the priesthood for the Diocese of Corpus Christi at the Corpus Christi Cathedral. 

Pope Francis appointed Kihneman as the fourth bishop for the Diocese of Biloxi on December 16, 2016. Kihneman was to be consecrated as a bishop on February 17, 2017, but due to health reasons, his consecration was postponed  until April 28, 2017. He was consecrated then by Archbishop Thomas  Rudi.

See also

 Catholic Church hierarchy
 Catholic Church in the United States
 Historical list of the Catholic bishops of the United States
 List of Catholic bishops of the United States
 Lists of patriarchs, archbishops, and bishops

References

External links

 Roman Catholic Diocese of Biloxi Official Site

1952 births
Living people
People from Lafayette, Louisiana
Catholics from Louisiana
21st-century Roman Catholic bishops in the United States
Bishops appointed by Pope Francis